Jack Marton (born 7 July 1992) is an Australian taekwondo practitioner. He won the gold medal in the men's 74 kg event at the 2015 Pacific Games held in Port Moresby, Papua New Guinea. He repeated this in 2019 with the gold medal in the men's 80 kg event at the 2019 Pacific Games held in Apia, Samoa.

Career 

In 2013, he competed in the men's lightweight event at the 2013 World Taekwondo Championships held in Puebla, Mexico and in 2015, he competed in the men's lightweight event at the 2015 World Taekwondo Championships held in Chelyabinsk, Russia.

He qualified to represent Australia at the 2020 Summer Olympics in Tokyo, Japan after winning the men's 80 kg event at the 2020 Oceania Taekwondo Olympic Qualification Tournament held in Gold Coast, Australia. In the final, he defeated Alexander Allen of Guam. At the 2020 Summer Olympics, he competed in the men's 80 kg event where he was eliminated in his first match by eventual bronze medalist Seif Eissa of Egypt.

Achievements

References

External links
 

Living people
1992 births
Place of birth missing (living people)
Australian male taekwondo practitioners
Taekwondo practitioners at the 2020 Summer Olympics
Olympic taekwondo practitioners of Australia
21st-century Australian people